Death Race may refer to:

Death Race franchise
 Death Race (franchise)
 Death Race 2000, a 1975 cult action film
 Death Race 2000 (album)
 Death Race (2008 film), a remake of Death Race 2000
 Death Race 2, 2010 prequel to the 2008 film
 Death Race 3: Inferno, 2013 film set between the 2010 and 2008 films
Death Race 2050, a 2017 sequel to Death Race 2000
 Death Race: Beyond Anarchy, a 2018 sequel to the 2008 film

Other
Death Race (1976 video game), a 1976 video game
Death Race (1990 video game), a remake of the 1976 game
 Death Racers, a 2008 action film
Canadian Death Race, an annual adventure race
Death Race (1973 film), 1973 World War II film
Death Race for Love, 2019 album by American Rapper Juice Wrld
Death Race, a limited show based on fictional vehicles racing from Rooster Teeth#ScrewAttack/Death Battle

See also
 A Race Against Death